H & M Hennes & Mauritz AB or H&M Group (abbreviated H&M) is a multinational clothing company based in Sweden that focuses on fast-fashion clothing for men, women, teenagers, and children. As of 23 June 2022, H&M Group operates in 75 geographical markets with 4,801 stores under the various company brands, with 107,375 full-time equivalent positions.

H&M is the second largest international clothing retailer. H&M was founded by Erling Persson, and its current CEO is Helena Helmersson.

History
The company was founded by Erling Persson in 1947 when he opened his first shop in Västerås, Sweden. The shop, called Hennes (Swedish for "hers"), exclusively sold women's clothing. Another store opened in Norway in 1964. In 1968, Persson acquired the hunting apparel retailer Mauritz Widforss in Stockholm, which led to the inclusion of a menswear collection in the product range, and the name change to Hennes & Mauritz.

The company was listed on the Stockholm Stock Exchange in 1974. Shortly after, in 1976, the first store outside Scandinavia opened in London. H&M continued to expand in Europe and began to retail online in 1998 with the domain hm.com registered in 1997, according to data available via Whois. The opening of its first U.S. store on 31 March 2000 on Fifth Avenue in New York City marked the start of its expansion outside of Europe.

Home Furnishings 
In 2008, the company announced in a press release that it would begin selling home furnishings. While initially distributed online, the home furnishing items are now sold at H&M Home stores worldwide.

Other brands 
Concept stores, including COS, Weekday, Monki, and Cheap Monday, were launched following H&M's expansion in Asia. In 2009 and 2010, brand consultancy Interbrand ranked H&M as the twenty-first most-valuable global brand. Its worth was estimated at $12 billion to $16 billion. Under the "H&M with Friends", H&M will partner with Good American, a brand founded by Khloe Kardashian and Emme Grede, to feature their products in H&M's Swedish and German e-commerce shops.

Store openings worldwide 
H&M operated 2,325 stores at the end of 2011. At the end of August 2012, they were operating 304 more stores, bringing the total to 2,629. In September 2013, the retailer opened its 3000th store in Chengdu, China.

COVID-19 
In October 2020, H&M announced that it was planning to close 5% of its worldwide stores in 2021 as a result of the COVID-19 pandemic. The fashion retailer H&M closed 250 shops throughout the globe and moved the majority of its operations online. The H&M Group's sales growth remained at -34% year-over-year from 2020 week 12 to week 22.

Withdrawal from the Russian market (2022) 
Along with hundreds of other global companies, H&M announced on March 2, 2022, an end to retail operations of its more than 150 stores in Russia as a result of the Russian invasion of Ukraine. H&M cited that it stands "with all the people who are suffering" in Ukraine as well as for "the safety of customers and colleagues" in Russia. Having recently expanded via its Weekday and & Other Stories formats, Russia was H&M's sixth-biggest market at the time, representing 4% of group sales in the fourth quarter of 2021.

Supplies 
H&M sources raw materials from different areas around the world. The top three locations that ship its raw materials are China, Bangladesh, and India. Its retail headquarters is located in Sweden, where 21 suppliers and factories manufacture H&M's clothing products and accessories.

Models 

 Bathing suits were promoted by Karen Mulder (1992), Pamela Anderson (1995), Tyra Banks (1996), Helena Christensen (1998), Salma Hayek (1999), Gisele Bündchen (2000), Margareth LaHoussaye-Duvigny (2001), Christy Turlington (2002) and Heidi Klum (2003).
In 2007, H&M and Kylie Minogue launched a swimwear line in Shanghai to celebrate H&M's presence in Asia.
Lana Del Rey was the face of H&M's 2012 global summer collection music video, in which she also sang a cover of "Blue Velvet" as a tribute to filmmaker David Lynch, whom she has said impacted her work.
In May 2013, Beyoncé was the face of H&M for her campaign, "Mrs. Carter in H&M," which drew heavily upon Knowles' personal style. The singer also included the track "Standing on the Sun" from her fifth studio album as the campaign soundtrack.

Designers 
In November 2004, select stores offered an exclusive collection by fashion designer Karl Lagerfeld. The press reported there were large crowds and that the initial inventories in the larger cities were sold out within an hour. 
In November 2006, the company launched a collection by Stella McCartney.
Also in November 2006, the company launched a collection by avant-garde Dutch designers Viktor & Rolf.
H&M launched a collaboration designed by pop star Madonna in March 2007.
In November 2007, several months after collaborating with Madonna, the company launched a collection by Italian designer Roberto Cavalli.
Finnish company Marimekko was chosen as a guest designer in spring 2008.
H&M partnered with Comme des Garçons, a Japanese fashion label, in the fall of 2008. Products in the collection included accessories, a unisex fragrance, and clothing for adults and children.
For spring and summer of 2009, British designer Matthew Williamson created two exclusive ranges for the company – the first being a collection of women's clothes that were released in select stores. For the second collection, Williamson ventured into creating menswear for the first time. It featured swimwear for men and women and was available in all of H&M's stores worldwide.
On 14 November 2009, the company released a limited-edition diffusion collection by Jimmy Choo featuring handbags and shoes for men and women, with prices ranging from £30 to £170. The collection also included clothing designed by Choo, such as garments made of suede and leather, and was available in 200 stores worldwide, including London's Oxford Circus store.
Sonia Rykiel collaborated with the company by designing a ladies knitwear and lingerie range that was released in select company stores on 5 December 2009.
French fashion house Lanvin collaborated with H&M to create a new collection, "Lanvin Hearts H&M," in fall 2010. The collection, designed to make Lanvin clothing more accessible to the average consumer, featured items that were around 100 euros. Usually Lanvin dresses would cost hundreds of euros more.
For Spring and Summer 2011, the company worked with fashion blogger Elin Kling, whose collection was only available at select stores.
H&M announced a collaboration with Versace in June 2011 that was later released on November 19. Versace also planned a Spring collaboration with the company that would only be available in countries with online sales. Similar to past collaborations, Versace agreed to let H&M use its name for a previously agreed-upon sum, without actually having a role in the design process.
H&M announced a collaboration with Marni in November 2011. The campaign launched a few months later in Mah 2012 and was led by director Sofia Coppola. 
On 4 October 2012, Vogue Japan editor Anna Dello Russo launched an accessories collection with H&M as Paris Fashion Week drew to an end. The collection was stocked in 140 H&M stores worldwide and was also available to purchase online.
On 12 June 2012, H&M confirmed that it would launch a collaboration with avant-garde label Maison Martin Margiela for a fall rollout. The Maison Martin Margiela collection for H&M hit stores a few months later on 15 November 2012.
Isabel Marant was a collaboration designer for fall 2013 and, for the first time in her career, made a few men's pieces to accompany the women's collection. The collection sold out very quickly in cities across the globe and was heavily anchored in sales online.
During the Coachella Valley Music and Arts Festival in California, H&M announced its first collaboration with an American designer. Alexander Wang was the designer chosen and the collection was released to a select 250 stores around the world on 6 November 2014.
Balmain was announced as the next collaboration with H&M through Balmain designer Olivier Rousteing's Instagram page. The collection was released on 5 November 2015. That year's H&M Christmas campaign was made in collaboration with popstar Katy Perry, who also sang the commercial soundtrack "'Every Day Is A Holiday".
In November 2016, H&M released a designer line in collaboration with Kenzo. That year the company released an annual holiday movie directed by Wes Anderson as part of the company's Christmas advertising campaign. Titled "Come Together", the short film starred Adrien Brody as a train conductor who saves Christmas after a blizzard delays the train's arrival and causes the few passengers to miss part of the holiday.
Swedish singer Zara Larsson designed a "playful, young, empowering and little glamorous" collection with H&M in February 2017.
After 20 years, Naomi Campbell came back to collaborate with the company for a global female empowerment commercial spot in fall 2017. She wore clothes that blurred the line between masculine and feminine in the campaign's Tokyo spot-video where she lip-synced "Wham Rap (Enjoy What You Do)" by Wham!.
Designers Jeremy Scott and Moschino collaborated with the brand in April 2018.
With the idea of reviving the spirit of the swinging sixties, H&M collaborated with designer Richard Allan in July 2019.
The Fleur du Soleil collection, part of H&M's collaboration with Lebanese designer Sandra Mansour, was released in August 2020 and marked the first time the company had partnered with an Arab designer.
Irish designer Simone Rocha, daughter of designer John Rocha, was announced as a collaborative partner in March 2021. Rocha's designs launched with an H&M campaign film and images shot by Tyler Mitchell.

Showcasing

The Sims 2 
Working with Maxis in June 2007, H&M created a stuff pack for the game developers' The Sims 2 computer game, H&M Fashion Stuff.

Imagine Fashion 
In March 2011, the brand's clothing was featured in an interactive fashion art film by Imagine Fashion called Decadent Control, starring Roberto Cavalli, Kirsty Hume, Eva Herzigová and Brad Kroenig.

Voice Interactive Mirror 
In 2018, the flagship New York City location tried out an in-store "Voice Interactive Mirror" developed by Microsoft and Ombori. The mirror, designed to have voice and facial recognition, acted as a personal shopping assistant and also encouraged customers to sign up for newsletters and scan QR codes. A German CPG news source, Lebensmittelzeitung, concluded that "86% of customers who took a selfie ended up scanning the QR code and 10% of [customers] also registered for the newsletter."

Loooptopia 
In 2023, H&M partnered with Roblox, online game platform to create an interactive online experience. Customers will be able style their virtual selves in newly created clothes and even trade or recycle clothes.

Sustainability and environmental awareness

Used garment vouchers 
Starting in February 2013, H&M began offering patrons a voucher in exchange for used garments. Donated garments were to be processed by I:CO, a retailer that repurposes and recycles used clothing with the goal of creating a zero waste economy. The initiative is similar to an April 2012 clothes-collection voucher program launched by Marks & Spencer in partnership with Oxfam.

Endangered forests 
In April 2014, H&M joined Zara and other apparel companies in changing their supply chain to avoid endangered forests. The company teamed with Canopy, a nonprofit, to remove endangered and ancient forests from their dissolvable pulp supply chain for their viscose and rayon fabrics.

The H&M Foundation 
The H&M Foundation, a nonprofit, was established in 2014 to fund projects that improve humanitarian and environmental issues within the fashion industry. The Persson family, the founders and owners of H&M, originally invested $180 million in the foundation. One of the foundation's projects includes the Green Machine, a recycling technology that would allow clothing to be recycled in a similar way to aluminum can recycling. Since 2013, the family has made contributions to the foundation, donating SEK1.1 billion (US$154 million) to it. According to the OECD, H&M Foundation's financing for 2019 development increased by 7% to $17 million USD. In August 2015, the H&M Foundation announced that it will award the Global Change Award, a million-euro annual prize, to advance recycling technology and techniques within the fashion industry. In 2021, H&M Foundation launched a virtual clothing collection named “The Billion Dollar Collection” that featured ten sustainable fashion innovation startups.

Brazilian leather halt 
In September 2019, H&M halted its leather purchases from Brazil in response to the 2019 Amazon rainforest wildfires. The company issued an email statement: "The ban will be active until there are credible assurance systems in place to verify that the leather does not contribute to environmental harm in the Amazon." H&M imports only a small fraction of its leather needs from the country.

Sustainability ambassador hiring 
Actress Maisie Williams joined the brand as a global sustainability ambassador in April 2021. As a global sustainability ambassador, she helped front the company's campaign on using only recycled or sustainably sourced materials by 2030. The first initiative fronted by the actress has led to a collaboration with the video game Animal Crossing, with Williams being transformed into a digital game character to teach the virtues of recycling.

Rental clothing 
In May 2021, H&M announced a temporary rental clothing service that allows men to rent suits for up to 24 hours for job interviews. It began in the UK and was also being tested in the United States.

Concept stores

Five concept brands
In addition to the H&M brand, the company consists of six individual brands with separate concepts. Brands include Afound, Arket, COS, Monki, Weekday, and & Other Stories.

COS
COS launched its flagship store on London's Regent Street in March 2007 with a catwalk show at the Royal Academy. Its concept is encompassed by minimalist style inspired by architecture, graphics, and design.

It specializes in modern clothing pieces for men and women that are less trend-oriented than other similarly priced labels. COS makes clothing that can be worn beyond the season. COS has 197 stores in 34 countries in Europe, Asia, North America, Australia and the Middle East and currently retails online to 19 markets via cosstores.com.

H&M Details 
2016 saw the hoarding of a new H&M concept in The Dubai Mall come up, labelled now 'H&M Details'.

Labor practices

Working conditions

Cambodia 
In August 2011, nearly 300 workers fainted in one week at a Cambodian factory supplying H&M. Fumes from chemicals, poor ventilation, malnutrition, and even "mass hysteria" have all been blamed for making workers ill. The minimum wage in the country is the equivalent of $66 (£42) a month, an amount that is less than half of what is required to meet basic needs, according to human rights groups.

Bangladesh 
The same year, Bangladeshi and international labor groups put forth a detailed safety proposal that entailed the establishment of independent inspections of garment factories. The plan called for inspectors to have the power to close unsafe factories. The proposal entailed a legally binding contract between suppliers, customers, and unions. At a meeting in 2011 in Dhaka, major European and North American retailers, including H&M, rejected the proposal. Further efforts by unions to advance the proposal after numerous and deadly factory fires have been rejected.

Myanmar 
After Feb. 1, 2021 military coup d'etat, many labor groups demanded H&M and other apparel companies divest from Myanmar because of the concern that there would be labor rights abuses. There have been multiple reports of labor abuses in factories making H&M clothes. A labor news outlet reported that a worker from Saung Oo Shwe Nay factory that makes H&M clothing was physically abused. Myanmar Labour News quoted FGWM, a labor union, with photos on how the worker was abused by her supervisors. There are multiple reports from other workers from the same factory complaining that they were also physically abused and the employers did not take responsibility, according to the union. There are increasing amount of labor abuses occurring in Myanmar under the military dictatorship. The largest labor group CTUM has been reporting to the International Labor Organization yearly on Myanmar labor abuses.

Supply chain transparency 
The Guardian wrote that in a conscious action sustainability report for 2012, H&M published a list of factories supplying 95% of its garments. This contributes to the trend of corporations leaning toward ethically transparent supply chains.

Slave and child labour 
On 2 January 2013, The Ecologist reported allegations by Anti-Slavery International that H&M was continuing its association with the Uzbek government in exploiting child and adult forced labor as cotton harvesters in Uzbekistan.

In September 2020, amid international allegations over the use of Uyghur forced labor in Xinjiang, H&M published a statement saying that it had stopped buying cotton from growers in Xinjiang, stating that it was "deeply concerned by reports from civil society organizations and media that include accusations of forced labor and discrimination of ethno-religious minorities".

In February 2017, The Guardian reported children were employed to make H&M products in Myanmar and were paid 13p (about 15 cents US) an hour – half the full legal minimum wage.

Factory building structural collapses

Savar building, Bangladesh 
In April 2013, the Rana Plaza building collapsed in Bangladesh killing over 1,100 people. Fatalities were mostly garment workers. The incident is considered the deadliest non-deliberate structural failure accident and the deadliest garment factory disaster in modern history. The eight-story building complex that was not designed for factory production and had cracks in the structure that the owners ignored. Approximately 2,500 injured people were rescued from the rubble.

The company and other retailers signed on to the Accord on Factory and Building Safety in Bangladesh. In June 2016, SumOfUs launched a campaign to pressure H&M to honor the commitment they made and signed to protect Bangladesh's garment workers. SumOfUs alleged that "H&M is drastically behind schedule in fixing the safety hazards its workers have to face every day."

Phnom Penh, Cambodia 
On 19 May 2013, a textile factory that produced apparel for H&M in Phnom Penh, Cambodia collapsed, injuring several people. The incident has raised concerns regarding industrial safety regulations.

Living wage 
On 25 November 2013, H&M's global head of sustainability committed that H&M, as the world's second-largest clothing retailer, would aim to pay all textile workers "living wage" by 2018, stating that governments are responding too slowly to poor working conditions in Bangladesh among other Asian countries where many clothing retailers source a majority if not all of their garments. Wages were increased in Bangladesh from 3,000 takas ($40) to 5,300 takas ($70) a month in late 2013.

Fire safety report 
In September 2015, CleanClothes.org, an NGO involved in garment labor working conditions, reported on a lack of specific fire safety renovations in H&M suppliers' factories.

Xinjiang region 
In 2020, the Australian Strategic Policy Institute accused at least 82 major brands, including H&M, of being connected to forced Uyghur labor in Xinjiang.

Controversy

Boycotts by China 
In March 2021, after the EU, UK, US, and Canada's joint sanctions against China over reports of human rights abuses in Xinjiang, H&M's stance on avoiding forced labor in Xinjiang and claim of not going to use cotton produced there was found and criticized by the Communist Youth League of China on its official Weibo page. Their post stated, "Spreading rumors to boycott Xinjiang cotton, while trying to make a profit in China? Wishful thinking!"

The viral post spread across mainland Chinese social media, leading to H&M facing significant criticism among Chinese social media users. On 24 March 2021, H&M became the first fashion brand to be targeted in China, with its products removed from Chinese e-commerce platforms such as Pinduoduo, JD.com and Alibaba, its mobile application removed from Chinese app stores, and rideshare platform DiDi blocking customers from requesting H&M stores as their destinations. Two of H&M's brand ambassadors in China, Huang Xuan and Victoria Song, announced they were no longer collaborating with H&M.

In August 2022, H&M resumed sales in China.

Response 
Chinese state media outlet China Global Television Network countered the statements against Xinjiang cotton with a video showing automation in cotton-picking and local Uyghurs claiming that the industry brought high earnings. On 26 March 2021, the United States condemned the China-backed boycotts, with its Department of Commerce stating that the United States "has taken strong actions to stop China from profiting off of its human-rights abuses in Xinjiang and to stop imports of products made with forced labor in China."

On 31 March, H&M responded with a statement vowing to rebuild trust in China and serve its customers in a "respectful way". H&M reported sales in China had fallen by approximately 23% for the second quarter of 2021 (compared to the same period in the last fiscal year). According to a report, more than half a million are forced to pick cotton in Xinjiang.

Greenwashing Claims

A proposed class action lawsuit in the US is alleging H&M is greenwashing via the sustainability claims made in its Conscious Choice range. Earlier this year, The Norwegian Consumer Agency (Forbrukertilsynet) said it believed Norrøna is “breaking the law” in marketing clothes as environmentally friendly and issued a warning to H&M GROUP against using the same type of environmental claims.

Leaving Russia 
In March 2022, the H&M Group communicated that they would pause its operations in Russia due to the Russian invasion of Ukraine.

Other controversies

Philanthropy 
Since January 2012 H&M has offered its H&M Design Award, an annual design prize for fashion graduates. The prize is established to support young designers with the beginning of their careers.

See also
 Bonds (clothing)
 Gap Inc.
 List of companies of Sweden
 European Retail Round Table
 Zara (retailer)

Notes

References

External links 

 
 

Clothing brands
Clothing brands of Sweden
Clothing retailers of Sweden
Multinational companies headquartered in Sweden
Companies based in Stockholm
Clothing companies established in 1947
Design companies established in 1947
Retail companies established in 1947
Swedish companies established in 1947
2000s fashion
2010s fashion
Swedish brands
Online retailers of Sweden
1970s initial public offerings
Companies listed on Nasdaq Stockholm
Persson family